Phyllonorycter amseli is a moth of the family Gracillariidae. It is found in Croatia and Montenegro.

The larvae feed on Quercus polycarpa and Quercus pubesecens. They mine the leaves of their host plant. They create a lower-surface tentiform mine.

External links
bladmineerders.nl
Fauna Europaea

amseli
Moths of Europe
Moths described in 1955